Hrdina (feminine Hrdinová) is a Czech and Slovak surname (meaning "hero"), it may refer to:
 Adam Hrdina, Slovak footballer
 Eva Hrdinová, Czech tennis player
 Jan Hrdina, Czech ice hockey player
 Jiří Hrdina, Czech ice hockey player
 Miroslav Hrdina, Slovak footballer

Czech-language surnames
Slovak-language surnames